"Her Majesty" is a song by the English rock band the Beatles, from their 1969 album Abbey Road. Written by Paul McCartney and credited to Lennon–McCartney, it is a brief tongue-in-cheek music hall song. Although credited to the band, McCartney is the only Beatle to appear on the track. "Her Majesty" is the final cut on the album and appears 14 seconds after the previous song "The End", but was not listed on the original sleeve. Some observers consider it the first example of a hidden track.

Recording
The song was recorded in three takes on 2 July 1969, prior to the Beatles beginning work on "Golden Slumbers/Carry That Weight". McCartney sang and simultaneously played a fingerstyle acoustic guitar accompaniment. The decision to exclude it from the Abbey Road medley was made on 30 July.

It runs only 23 seconds, but the Beatles also recorded a longer version during the Get Back sessions.

In the song, the singer muses about the Queen and his plan to someday "make her mine".

Structure and placement
The song was originally placed between "Mean Mr. Mustard" and "Polythene Pam"; McCartney decided that the sequence did not work and it was edited out of the album's closing medley by Abbey Road Studios tape operator John Kurlander. He was instructed by McCartney to destroy the tape, but EMI policy stated that no Beatles recording was ever to be destroyed. The fourteen seconds of silence between "The End" and "Her Majesty" are the result of Kurlander's lead-out tape added to separate the song from the rest of the recording.

The loud chord that occurs at the beginning of the song is the ending, as recorded, of "Mean Mr. Mustard". "Her Majesty" ends abruptly because its own final note was left at the beginning of "Polythene Pam". McCartney applauded Kurlander's "surprise effect" and the track became the unintended closer to the LP. The crudely edited beginning and end of "Her Majesty" shows that it was not meant to be included in the final mix of the album; as McCartney says in The Beatles Anthology, "Typical Beatles – an accident." The song was not listed on the original vinyl record's sleeve, as they had already been printed; on reprinted sleeves, however, it is listed. The CD edition corrects this.

The CD version also mimics the original LP version in that the CD contains a 14-second long silence immediately after "The End" before "Her Majesty" starts playing. Digital versions also include a 14-second long silence after "The End".

At 23 seconds long, "Her Majesty" is the shortest song in the Beatles' repertoire (contrasting the same album's "I Want You (She's So Heavy)", their longest song (at 7:47) apart from "Revolution 9", an 8:22 avant-garde piece from The Beatles). Both of the original sides of vinyl close with a song that ends abruptly (the other being "I Want You (She's So Heavy)"). The song starts panned hard right and slowly pans to hard left.

In October 2009, MTV Networks released a downloadable version of the song (as well as the entire album) for the video game The Beatles: Rock Band that gave players the ability to play the missing last chord. Apple Corps granted rights to this and to other changes to Harmonix Music Systems, which developed the game. The alteration garnered controversy among some fans who preferred the recorded version's unresolved close.

The fiftieth anniversary "Super Deluxe Edition" of Abbey Road includes a bonus track, "The Long One", that consists of a trial edit and mix of the medley, with "Her Majesty" placed between "Mean Mr. Mustard" and "Polythene Pam".

Personnel
 Paul McCartney – lead vocals, acoustic guitar

Live performance
McCartney performed the song in front of the Queen at the Party at the Palace on 
3 June 2002, part of the Golden Jubilee celebrations.

Cover versions
The song has been covered by such bands as Pearl Jam, Art Brut, and Chumbawamba, who developed it in an extended version with new lyrics, turning it into an attack on the Royal Family.

Notes

References

External links
 

The Beatles songs
1969 songs
Song recordings produced by George Martin
Songs written by Lennon–McCartney
Songs published by Northern Songs
2002 singles
Cultural depictions of Elizabeth II
Chumbawamba songs
Songs about queens